The following is a list of Canadian artists working in visual or plastic media (including 20th-century artists working in video art, performance art, or other types of new media). See other articles for information on Canadian literature, music, cinema and culture. For more specific information on the arts in Canada, see Canadian art.

The Artists in Canada Reference Library provides an in-depth list of Canadian artists and the museums who feature them. The following is a brief list of some important Canadian artists and groups of artists:

Individuals

A 

 Kirsten Abrahamson (born 1960), ceramist
 Kim Adams (born 1951), sculptor
 Michael Adamson (born 1971), painter
 Marc Adornato (born 1977), painting, sculpting, performance and new media
Latcholassie Akesuk (1919–2000), sculptor
 Manasie Akpaliapik (born 1955), sculptor
 Eric Aldwinckle (1909-1980), designer
 David T. Alexander (born 1947), painter
 M.J. Alexander (born 1961), artist
 Vikky Alexander (born 1959), artist
 John Martin Alfsen (1902–1971), printmaker
 Ralph Allen (1926–2019), artist, painter and printmaker
 Edmund Alleyn (1931–2004), painter
 Stephen Andrews (born 1956), artist
 Kay Angliss (1923–2004), printmaker, watercolour and fibre art
 Elizabeth Angrnaqquaq (1916–2003), textile artist
 Danielle April (born 1949)
Isa Paddy Aqiattusuk (1898–1954), sculptor
 Louis Archambault (1915-2003), sculptor, ceramicist
 Robert Archambeau (born 1933), ceramist
 Shelagh Armstrong (born 1961), painter
 Roy Arden (born 1957), sculptor
 Kenojuak Ashevak (1927–2003), artist and printmaker
 Myfanwy Ashmore (born 1970), new media artist
 Barbara Astman (born 1950), photography and new media
 William Edwin Atkinson (1862-1926), painter
 Ghazaleh Avarzamani (born 1980), artist

B 

 Frédéric Back (1924–2013), painter, animator
 Joan Balzar (1928–2016), painter
 Frances Bannerman (1855–1944), painter, poet
 Marian Bantjes (born 1963), graphic designer, artist, illustrator, typographer, writer
 Bruce Barber (born 1950), multimedia installation artist
 J. M. Barnsley (1861–1929), painter
 Ed Bartram (1938–2019), printmaker, painter
 Earl W. Bascom (1906–1995), sculptor, painter, printmaker, Fellow of the Royal Society of Arts
 Robert Bateman (born 1930), painter, naturalist
 Patricia Martin Bates (born 1927), printmaker
 Jay Battle (born 1966), Canadian-born sculptor now working in Salisbury, England
 Helen D. Beals (1897–1991), painter
 Carl Beam (1943–2005), painter
 Jackson Beardy (1944–1984), painter
 J. W. Beatty (1869–1941), painter
 Henri Beau (1863–1949), Impressionist painter 
 Charles Beil (1894–1976), sculptor
 Sylvie Bélanger (1951–2020), installation artist
 Léon Bellefleur (1910–2007), painter
 Rebecca Belmore (born 1960), performance artist, installation artist
 Louis Belzile (1929–2019), painter, member of the Plasticiens in Montreal
 Lorraine Bénic (born 1937), painter, sculptor
 Tom Benner (born 1950), sculptor, installation artist  
 Douglas Bentham (born 1947), sculptor
 William Berczy (1744–1813), painter
 Judith Berry (born 1961), painter
 George Théodore Berthon (1806–1892), painter 
 Derek Michael Besant (born 1950), printmaker, painter
 Aggie Beynon, metalsmith
 David Bierk (1944–2002), painter
 B. C. Binning (1909–1976), painter
 David Blackwood (1941-2022), printmaker
 David Blatherwick (born 1960), painter, video artist
 Molly Lamb Bobak (1920–2014), painter, printmaker
 Catherine Bolduc (born 1970), drawing, sculpture, installation, public art
 David Bolduc (1945–2010), painter
 Eleanor Bond (born 1948), multi-media artist, art educator
 Theodosia Bond (1915–2009), photography
 Jordi Bonet (1932–1979), sculptor, muralist
 Paul-Émile Borduas (1905–1960), painter
 Sam Borenstein (1908–1969), painter
 Simone Mary Bouchard (1912–1945), painter, textile artist
 Céline Boucher (born 1945)
 Robert Bourdeau (born 1931), photographer
 John Boxtel (born 1930), sculpture, woodcarving
 John Boyle (born 1941), painter
 Shary Boyle (born 1972), sculpture, painting, drawing, performance
 Barry Bradfield (born 1981), cartoonist
 Claude Breeze (born 1938), painter
 Roland Brener (1942–2006), sculptor
 Mark A. Brennan (born 1968), landscape painter
 Rita Briansky (born 1925), painter and printmaker
 AA Bronson (born 1946), mixed-media artist
 Reva Brooks (1913–2004), photographer
 J. Archibald Browne (1862–1948), painter
 William Brymner (1855–1925), painter
 Karin Bubaš (born 1976), painter, photographer
 David Buchan (1950-1994), performance artist, designer
 Cecil Tremayne Buller (1886–1973), printmaker
 Martin Bureau, multimedia
 Dennis Burton (artist) (1933–2013), painter
 Ralph Wallace Burton (1905–1983), painter
 Edward Burtynsky (born 1955), photographer
 Jack Bush (1909–1977), painter
 Jane Buyers (born 1948), sculptor

C 

 Elaine Cameron-Weir (born 1985), visual artist
 Janet Cardiff (born 1957), installation artist
 James Carl (born 1960), sculptor
 Florence Carlyle (1864–1923), painter
 Franklin Carmichael (1890–1945), member of the Group of Seven
 Emily Carr (1871–1945), painter
 Ian Carr-Harris (born 1941), installation artist
 Barbara Caruso (1937–2009), painter
 Gino Cavicchioli (born 1957), sculptor, artist
 Christiane Chabot (born 1950), artist
 Cynthia Chalk (1913–2018), nature photography
 Frederick Challener (1869–1959), muralist, painter, teacher
 Jack Chambers (1931–1978), artist and filmmaker
 Horace Champagne (born 1937), master pastelist
 Robert Chaplin (born 1968), artist, publisher
 Nan Lawson Cheney (1897–1985), painter and medical artist
 Ann Clarke (born 1944), abstract painter
 Benjamin Chee Chee (1944–1977), printmaker, painter
 F. S. Coburn (1871–1960), painter, illustrator, photographer
 Stanley Cosgrove (1911–2002), painter, draughtsperson and muralist
 Graham Coughtry (1931–1999), painter
 Yucho Chow (1876–1949), photographer
 F. S. Coburn (1871–1960), painter, illustrator, photographer
 Daniel Cockburn (born 1976), video artist, performance artist, film director
 Keith Cole, performance artist
 Nicole Collins, painter
 Alex Colville (1920–2013), painter
 Stephanie Comilang (born 1980), artist and filmmaker
 Christian Corbet (born 1966), painter, sculptor
 Sonia Cornwall (1919–2006), painter
 Bruno Cote (1940–2010), painter
 Douglas Coupland (born 1961), sculptural installation
 E.B. Cox (1914–2003), sculptor
 Josephine Crease (1864–1947), painter
 Marlene Creates (born 1952), artist
 Susan Reynolds Crease (1855–1947), painter and women's rights activist
 William Nicoll Cresswell (1818–1888), painter
 Arthur Crisp (1881-1974), designer, illustrator, muralist
 Donigan Cumming (born 1947), multimedia artist
 Greg Curnoe (1936–1992), painter, musician
 George Cuthbertson (1898–1969), marine artist, researcher, author

D 

 Karen Dahl (born 1955) ceramist
 Greta Dale (1929–1978), sculptor
 Frederick Dally (1838–1914), photographer
 Ken Danby (1940–2007), painter
 Charles Daudelin (1920–2001), sculptor, painter
 Olea Marion Davis (1899–1977), ceramist, sculptor
 Raven Davis (born 1975), multimedia and mixed media artist
 Betty Davison  (1909-2000), printmaker
 Dennis Day (born 1960), video artist
 Forshaw Day (1837–1901), landscape artist, printmaker
 Cozette de Charmoy (born 1939), multidisciplinary artist
 Nicholas Raphael de Grandmaison (1892–1978), painter
 Louis de Niverville (1933–2019), painter
 Eric Deis (born 1979), photographer
 Roseline Delisle (1952–2003), ceramist
 Xiomara De Oliver (born 1967), painter
 René Derouin (born 1936), printmaker
 Berthe des Clayes (1877–1968), painter
 Bonnie Devine (born 1952), Ojibway installation artist, performance artist, and sculptor
 Walter Dexter (1931–2015), ceramist
 Yuri Dojc (born 1946), photographer
 Lynn Donoghue (1953–2003), painter
 Stan Douglas (born 1960), installation artist
 Ann MacIntosh Duff (1925–2022), painter  
 Walter R. Duff (1879–1967), painter, designer
 Caroline Dukes (1929–2003), painter, installation artist
 Albert Dumouchel (1916–1971), printmaker, painter, teacher
 Kyle Bobby Dunn (born 1986), sound artist, composer, painter
 Aganetha Dyck (born 1937), sculptor, installation artist
 Edmond Dyonnet (1859–1954), painter, teacher
 Marcel Dzama (born 1974), artist

E 

 Susan Edgerley (born 1960), glass artist
Arthur Elliot (1809–1892), watercolourist
 Emily Louise Orr Elliott (1867–1952), oil painter and fashion designer
 Harold Elliott (1890-1968), painter
Ennutsiak (1896–1967), sculptor
 Arthur John Ensor (1905–1995), painter
Lucassie Etungat (1951–c. 2016), sculptor
 Evergon (born 1946), photographer and photo-collage
 Paterson Ewen (1925–2002), painter
 Ivan Eyre (born 1935), painter

F 

 Barker Fairley (1887–1986), painter, writer
 Lilias Farley (1907–1989), painter 
 Geoffrey Farmer (born 1967), installation artist
 Caroline Farncomb (1859–1951), painter 
 André Fauteux (born 1946), sculptor
 Marcelle Ferron (1924–2001), painter, glazier
 George Fertig (1915–1983), painter
 Peter Flinsch (1920–2010), painter, sculptor, television set designer
 Dulcie Foo Fat (born 1946), painter
 Marc-Aurèle Fortin (1988 -1970), painter
 Margaret Frame (1903–1985), painter
 Leonard Frank (1870–1944), photographer
 Statira Elizabeth Frame (1870–1935), painter

G 

 Louise Landry Gadbois (1896–1985), painter
 Robert Ford Gagen (1847–1926), painter
 Charles Gagnon (1934-2003), multidisciplinary artist
 Yechel Gagnon (born 1973), mixed media artist
 Marianna Gartner (born 1963), painter
 Pierre Gauvreau (1922–2011), painter, writer
 Wyn Geleynse (born 1947), pioneer film and video projection artist 
 Carlo Gentile (1835–1893), photographer
 Robert Genn painter
 Will Gill (born 1968), sculptor, painter, photographer and video artist
 Violet Gillett (1898–1996), painter
 Joseph Giunta (1911–2001), painter, collage/assemblage artist
 Gerald Gladstone (1929–2005), sculptor, painter
 Henry George Glyde (1906–1998), painter, draftsperson, art educator
 Elaine Goble visual artist
 Ted Godwin (1933–2013), painter, member of the Regina Five 
 Eric Goldberg (1890–1969), painter
 Dina Goldstein (born 1969), visual artist
 Noam Gonick (born 1973), filmmaker
 Betty Goodwin (1923–2008), printmaker, sculptor, painter
 Paul Goranson (1911–2002), painter
 Hortense Gordon (1886–1961), painter
 Richard Gorman (1935–2010), painter, printmaker
 K.M. Graham (1913–2008), painter
 Rodney Graham (born 1949), photographer, installation artist
 Pierre Granche (1948–1997), sculptor
 John Greer (born 1944), sculptor
 Edmund Wyly Grier (1862–1957), painter
 Angela Grossmann (born 1955), painter
 Aline Gubbay (1920–2005), photographer, art historian
 Suzanne Guité (1927–1981), sculptor, painter

H 

 Samra Habib, photographer
 Alexandra Haeseker (born 1945), painter, printmaker, installation artist 
 Fred Hagan (1918–2003), lithographer, painter, art instructor
 John Hall (born 1943), painter
 Paul Hartal (born 1936), painter, poet
 John Hartman (artist), (born 1950), painter
 Bess Larkin Housser Harris, (1890–1969), painter
 Lawren Harris (1885–1970), painter
 Douglas Haynes (1936–2016), painter
 J. C. Heywood (born 1941), printmaker
 Fred Herzog (1930-2019), photographer
 Colleen Heslin (born 1976), painter
 Carle Hessay (1911–1978), painter
 Barbara Roe Hicklin (1918–2010), painter
 Gilah Yelin Hirsch (born 1944), multi-disciplinary artist
 William G. Hobbs (1927–2012), painter, historian
 Elizabeth Bradford Holbrook (1913–2009), sculptor
 Edwin Holgate (1892–1977), painter
 Elsie Holloway (1882–1971), photographer
 Robert Holmes (artist) (1861 – May, 1930), naturalist painter
 Thaddeus Holownia (born 1949), photographer
 Margaret Lindsay Holton (born 1955), painter, pinhole photographer, writer
 Elisabeth Margaret Hopkins (1894–1991), painter
 Frances Anne Hopkins (1838–1919), painter
 Robin Hopper (1939–2017), ceramist
 Cleeve Horne (1912–1998), painter, sculptor 
 Robert Houle (born 1947), First Nations artist
 Yvonne McKague Housser (1897–1996), painter, teacher
 Barbara Howard (1926–2002), painter, wood engraver
 Alexander Hryshko (born 1980), photographer
 Simone Hudon-Beaulac (1905–1984), painter, printmaker
 Natalka Husar (born 1951), painter

I 

 Charlie Inukpuk (born 1941), sculptor
Johnny Inukpuk (1911–2007), sculptor
Osuitok Ipeelee (1922–2005), sculptor
Jay Isaac (born 1975), painter
 Gershon Iskowitz (1921–1988), painter

J 

 A. Y. Jackson (1882–1974), painter
 Sybil Henley Jacobson (1881–1953), British-born Canadian painter
 Donald Jarvis (1923–2001), painter
 Charles William Jefferys (1869-1951) painter, illustrator, muralist, author
 Mendelson Joe (born 1944), painter, musician
 Frank Johnston (artist) (1888–1949), painter, member of the Group of Seven 
 John Young Johnstone (1887–1930), Impressionist painter
 G.B. Jones, illustrator, visual artist, experimental filmmaker
 Anique Jordan, multi-disciplinary artist
 Leonel Jules (born 1953), painter
 Brian Jungen (born 1970), sculptor, installation artist

K 

 Dusan Kadlec (1942–2018), painter
 Anne Kahane (born 1924), sculptor
 Yousuf Karsh (1908–2002), photographer
 Herzl Kashetsky (born 1950), painter
 Ali Kazimi (born 1961), filmmaker and media artist
 Shelagh Keeley (born 1956), visual artist
 Augustus Kenderdine (1870–1947), landscape and portrait artist
 Garry Neill Kennedy (1935–2021), conceptual artist and educator
 Kiakshuk (1886–1966), sculptor and printmaker
 Alicia Killaly (1836–1908), painter
 Holly King (born 1957), photographer
 Roy Kenzie Kiyooka (1926–1994), painting, performance, multi-media, photography
 Harold Klunder (born 1943), abstract painter
 Dorothy Knowles, (born 1927), painter
 Deborah Koenker, (born 1949), interdisciplinary artist
 John Koerner, (1913–2014), painter
 Germaine Koh (born 1967), conceptual artist
 Valérie Kolakis (born 1966), sculpture, installation 
 Cornelius Krieghoff (1815–1872), painter
 Nobuo Kubota (born 1932), multimedia
 Maya Kulenovic (born 1975), painter
 William Kurelek (1927–1977), painter

L 

 Stephen Lack (born 1946), actor, painter
 Sylvie Laliberté (born 1959), performance artist, video artist, musician
 Michel Lambeth (1923–1977), photographer
 Cal Lane (born 1968), sculptor
 Fenwick Lansdowne (1937–2008), wildlife artist
 Christine Laptuta (born 1951), photographer
 Jules Lasalle (born 1957), sculptor
 Ozias Leduc (1864–1955), painter
 Gary Lee-Nova (born 1943), painter, printmaker, sculptor, filmmaker
 Elizabeth Lefort (1914–2005), tapestry artist
 Joseph Légaré (1795–1855), painter
 Enid Legros-Wise (born 1943), ceramist
 Jean Paul Lemieux (1904–1990), painter
 Michel Lemieux (born 1959), multimedia artist (film, video, performance)
 Serge Lemoyne (1941–1998), painter
 Beatrice Lennie (1905–1987), sculptor
 Rita Letendre (1928–2021), abstract painter
 Laura L. Letinsky (born 1962), photographer
 Mark Lewis (born 1958), installation and film artist
 Maud Lewis (1903–1970), painter
 Robert Henry Lindsay (1868–1938), painter
 Robert Linsley (1952–2017), painter and writer
 Oleg Lipchenko (born 1957), artist and illustrator
 Arthur Lismer (1885–1969), painter
 Glen Loates (born 1945), painter and coin designer
 Judith Lodge (born 1941), painter and photographer
 Karen Lofgren (born 1976), painter
 Victor Albert Long (1866–1938), portrait painter
 Frederick Loveroff (1894–1959), painter
 Rafael Lozano-Hemmer (born 1967), installation artist
 Attila Richard Lukacs (born 1962), painter
 James Lumbers (born 1929), painter
 Almuth Lütkenhaus (1930–1996)
 Laura Muntz Lyall (1860–1930), painter

M 
	 
 J.E.H. MacDonald (1873–1932), painter, member of the Group of Seven
 Thoreau MacDonald (1901–1989), illustrator, graphic and book designer, artist
 Jock Macdonald (1897–1960), member of Painters Eleven
 John MacGregor (1942-2019), painter, printmaker, sculptor
 Landon Mackenzie (born 1954), painter
 Sarah Jean Munro Maclean (1873–1952), painter
 Arnaud Maggs (1926–2012), photographer
 Liz Magor (born 1948), visual artist
 Lorraine Malach (1933–2003), ceramist
 Rafał Malczewski (1892–1965), landscape and portrait painter
 Jen Mann (born 1987), portrait artist 
 Kavavaow Mannomee (born 1958), printmaker
 Enook Manomie (1941–2006), carver
 Charles Marega (1871–1939), sculptor
 Robert Markle (1936–1990), draughtsman, painter of the female nude
 Arthur N. Martin (1889–1961), painter
 Bernice Fenwick Martin (1902–1999), painter, printmaker
 Ron Martin (born 1943), abstract painter
 Thomas Mower Martin (1838–1934), landscape painter
 Âhasiw Maskêgon-Iskwêw (1958–2006), media artist
 Hannah Maynard (1834–1918), photographer
 Richard Maynard (1832–1907), photographer
 Doris McCarthy (1910–2010), painter, printmaker
 Ryan McCourt (born 1975), sculptor, designer
 Clark McDougall (1921-1980), painter
 Jean McEwen (1923–1999), abstract painter
 Elizabeth McGillivray Knowles (1866–1928), painter
 Florence Helena McGillivray (1864–1938), painter
 Elizabeth McIntosh (born 1967), painter
 Rita McKeough (born 1951), installation and performance artist
 Ruth Gowdy McKinley ((1931–1981), ceramic artist
 Isabel McLaughlin (1903-2002), painter, patron, philanthropist 
 Helen McNicoll (1879–1915), painter
 Ray Mead (1921–1998), painter, member of Painters Eleven
 Ivar Mendez, photographer and sculptor
 John Meredith (1933–2000), abstract painter
 Gwendolyn Mews (1893–1973), painter
 Arnold Mikelson (1922–1984), wood sculpto
 Laura Millard (born 1961), mixed media artist, educator
 Kenneth G. Mills (1923–2004), painter
 David Milne (1882–1953), painter
 Janet Mitchell (1912–1998), painter
 Ellen Moffat (born 1954), mixed media artist
 Esmaa Mohamoud (born 1992), sculptor, installation artist
 Leo Mol (1915–2009), stained glass artist, painter, sculptor 
 Guido Molinari (1933–2004), painter
 E. Louise De Montigny-Giguère (1878–1969), sculptor
 Edmund Montague Morris (1871–1913), painter
 Ron Moppett (born 1945), painter
 Kathleen Morris (1893-1986), painter
 Michael Morris (born 1942), visual artist, educator, curator
 Norval Morrisseau (1932–2007), painter
 Rita Mount (1885–1967), painter
 Jean-Paul Mousseau (1927–1991), painter, ceramist, muralist
 Kellypalik Mungitok (1940–?), printmaker
 Kathleen Munn (1887–1974), painter
 Will Munro (1975–2010), artist
 Paula Murray (born 1958), ceramist
 Robert Murray (born 1936), sculptor

N 

 Mina Napartuk (1913–2001), textile artist
 Alison Houston Lockerbie Newton (1890–1967), painter
 Lilias Torrance Newton (1896–1980), painter 
 Jack Nichols (1921–2009), painter
 Grace Nickel (born 1956), ceramist
 Adamie Niviaxie (1925–?), sculptor
 Louise Noguchi (born 1958), multidisciplinary visual artist 
 Arnold Nogy, painter
 Alice Nolin (1896–1967), sculptor
 Naveed Nour (born 1963), Iranian-Canadian/American photographer
 Elizabeth Styring Nutt (1870–1946), painter

O 

 John O'Brien (1831–1891), marine painter
 Lucius Richard O'Brien (1832–1899), painter, illustrator, first President of the Royal Canadian Academy
 Will Ogilvie (1901–1989), painter, war artist
 Katie Ohe (born 1937), sculptor
 Bobbie Oliver (born 1943), abstract painter
 Kim Ondaatje (born 1928), painter, filmmaker
Sheokjuk Oqutaq (1920–1982), sculptor
 Nina May Owens (1869–1959), painter

P 

 Charles Pachter (born 1942), artist, filmmaker, social commentator
 George Paginton (born 1901–1988), painter
 Aaron Paquette (born 1974), painter and writer
 Josie Pamiutu Papialuk (1918–1996), printmaker and sculptor
 Mimi Parent (1924–2005), painter
 Andrew James Paterson (born 1962), interdisciplinary artist
 Paul Peel (1860–1892), painter
 Sophie Pemberton (1869-1959), painter considered to be British Columbia's first professional woman artist
 Freda Pemberton-Smith (1902–1991), painter
 William Perehudoff (1918–2013), painter
 Mark Prent (1947-2020), sculptor, performance artist 
 Rajni Perera (born 1985), painter, sculptor
 Sheouak Petaulassie (1918 or 1923–1961), printmaker
 Ed Pien (born 1958), known for drawings, large-scale drawing-based installations
 Marjorie Pigott (1904–1990), painter
 Robert Pilot (1898–1967), painter
 Leopold Plotek (born 1948), painter
 Eegyvudluk Pootoogook (1931–2000), printmaker and sculptor
 Kananginak Pootoogook (1935–2010), sculptor and printmaker
 Narcisse Poirier (1883–1984), painter
 Edward Poitras (born in 1953), mixed-media sculptures, installations
 Christopher Pratt (born 1935), painter
 Mary Pratt (1935–2018), painter
 Ned Pratt (born 1964), photographer

Q 

 Lucy Qinnuayuak (1915–1982), graphic artist and printmaker

R 

 George Raab (born 1948), printmaker
 Nina Raginsky (born 1941), photographer
 William Raphael (1833–1914), painter
 Gordon Rayner (1935–2010), abstract expressionist painter
 Walter Redinger (1940–2014,) sculptor
 Gladys Reeves (1890–1974), photographer
 Don Reichert (1932–2013), painter, multimedia artist
 Bill Reid (1920–1998), sculptor
 George Agnew Reid (1860–1947), painter, influential educator, administrator
 Leslie Reid (born 1947), painter, printmaker 
 Mary Hiester Reid (1854–1921), painter
 Reinhard Reitzenstein (born 1949), environmental sculptor
 Kelly Richardson (born 1972), video artist, photographer
 Jean-Paul Riopelle (1923–2002), painter
 Jim Robb (born 1933), Yukon watercolour painter
 Goodridge Roberts (1904–1974), painter
 Albert H. Robinson (1881-1956), landscape painter
 Mélanie Rocan (born 1980), painter
 Brent Roe (born 1956), painter
 David Rokeby (born 1960), new media artist
 William Ronald (1926–1998), painter
 Ethel Rosenfield (1910–2000), sculptor
 Evelyn Roth (born 1936), interdisciplinary artist 
 Endel Ruberg (1917–1989), artist, educator
 Jeffrey Rubinoff (1945–2017), sculptor, founder of the Jeffrey Rubinoff Sculpture Park on Hornby Island
 John Wentworth Russell (1879–1959), painter
 Erica Rutherford (1923–2008), painter, filmmaker, writer

S 
	
 Benita Sanders (born 1935), printmaker, painter, pastelist
 Henry Saxe (born 1937), sculptor, painter, draughtsman
 Carl Schaefer (1903–1995), painter, war artist
 Tony Scherman (born 1950), painter
 Charlotte Schreiber (1834–1922), painter
 Jacques Schyrgens (born 1923), painter, illustrator
 John Scott (1950-2022), painter
 Regina Seiden (1897–1991), painter
 Aqjangajuk Shaa (1937–2019), stone carver
 Jack Shadbolt (1909–1998), painter
 Steven Shearer (born 1968), painter, draughtsman
 Peter Clapham Sheppard (1879–1964), painter
 Henrietta Shore (1880–1963), painter
 Coral Short (born 1973), performance artist
 Edward Scrope Shrapnel (1845-1920), painter
 Ron Shuebrook (born 1943), abstract painter, administrator
 Joe Shuster (1914–1992), cartoonist, co-creator of Superman
 Dave Sim (born 1956), comic book artist
 Ellen Rosalie Simon (1916–2011), stained-glass artist, illustrator, printmaker
 James Simpkins (1910–2004), cartoonist, illustrator, film strips
 Dionne Simpson (born 1972), textile artist
 Charlie Sivuarapik (1911–1968), sculptor, illustrator, and storyteller
 Paul Sloggett (born 1950), abstract painter
 Damien Smith (born 1969), visual artist
 Gord Smith (born 1937), sculptor
 Gordon A. Smith (1919–2020), painter, printmaker, sculptor
 Jean Smith (born 1959), musician, painter, author
 Michael Snow (born 1929), painter, filmmaker, musician
 Nicolas Sollogoub (1925–2014), sculptor, glassmaker
 Daniel Solomon (born 1945), abstract painter
 David G. Sorensen (1937–2011), painter, sculptor
 David Spriggs (born 1978), sculptor, installation artist
 Gerald Squires (1937–2015), painter, printmaker, sculptor
 Helen Stadelbauer (1910–2006), painter
 Arlene Stamp (born 1938), two-dimensional artist and designer
 Owen Staples (1866–1949), painter, etcher, political cartoonist
 Barbara Steinman (born 1950), video and installation artist
 Godfrey Stephens (born 1939), painter, sculptor, boat builder
 Ginny Stikeman (born 1941), filmmaker
 Reva Stone (born 1944), digital artist
 Ron Stonier (1933-2001), abstract painter 
 Rudolf Stussi (born 1947), painter
 Jack Sures (1934–2018), ceramist
 Marc Aurèle de Foy Suzor-Coté (1869–1937), painter, sculptor
 Gabor Szilasi (born 1928), photographer

T 

 Otis Tamasauskas (born 1947), printmaker, painter
 Takao Tanabe  (born 1926), painter
 Ewa Tarsia, painter, printmaker
 Jamasie Teevee (1910–1985), printmaker
 Ningeokuluk Teevee (born 1963), illustrator
 Nalenik Temela (1939–2003), sculptor
 Mashel Teitelbaum (1921–1985), painter
 Louis Temporale  (1909–1994), sculptor
 David Thauberger (born 1948), painter
 Genevieve Thauvette (born 1985), photographer
 George Campbell Tinning (1910–1996), painter, graphic designer, muralist, illustrator
 Jeff Thomas (born 1956), photo-based storyteller
 Denyse Thomasos (1964–2012), painter
 Tom Thomson (1877–1917), painter
 Gentile Tondino (1923–2001), painter
 Serge Tousignant  (born 1942), multidisciplinary artist, photographer
 Jackie Traverse (born 1969), painter
 Julie Tremble, animator, experimental videographer
 Angus Trudeau (1905–1984), painter, builder of ship models
 Akesuk Tudlik (1890–1966), printmaker and carver

U 
 Ina D.D. Uhthoff (1889–1971), painter

V 

 Armand Vaillancourt (born 1929), performance art, sculptor, painter
 John Vanderpant (1884–1939), photographer, gallery owner, author
 Frederick Varley (1881–1969), painter
 Bill Vazan (born 1933), land art, sculptor, photographer, painter
 Claude Vermette (1930–2006), painter, ceramist
 Frederick Arthur Verner (1836–1928), painter
 Arthur Villeneuve (1910–1990), painter
 Ola Volo, muralist
 Julie Voyce (born 1957), multi-media artist, printmaker

W 

 Marion Wagschal (born 1943), painter	
 Ruth Salter Wainwright (1902–1984), painter
 Horatio Walker (1858–1938), painter
 Jeff Wall (born 1946), photographer
 Esther Warkov (born 1941), painter, draughtsman
 Lowrie Warrener (1900–1983), painter 
 Margaret Watkins (1884–1969), photographer
 Homer Watson (1855–1936), painter
 Gordon Webber (1909–1965), multi-media pioneer of modernism, teacher
 Esther Wertheimer (1926–2016), sculptor, educator 
 W. P. Weston (1879–1967), painter, teacher
 Phil R. White (born 1963), sculptor
 Tim Whiten (born 1941), sculptor, performance and installation artist
 Peter and Catharine Whyte (1905–1966, 1906–1979), painters
 Joyce Wieland (1930–1998), painter
 Robert Wiens (born 1953), painter, sculptor
 Peter Wilkins (born 1968), multimedia artist
 Yvonne Williams (1901–1997), stained glass artist
 Curtis Williamson (1867–1944), painter 
 Jeff Willmore (born 1954), painter, performance artist
 Robert Willms (born 1969)
 Joan Willsher-Martel (1925–2017), painter
 York Wilson (1907–1984), painter, muralist
 Rita Winkler (born 1987), artist
 Susan Wood (1954–2018), artist
 Anna Wong (1930–2013), printmaker
 Hilda Woolnough (1934–2007), printmaker, painter, draughtsman 
 Kamila Wozniakowska (born 1956), painter
 Andrew Wright (born 1971), multimedia artist
 Mary E. Wrinch (1877–1969), painter, printmaker
 Dana Wyse (born 1965), installation artist

X 
 Gu Xiong (born 1953), multidisciplinary artist

Y 
 Xiaojing Yan (born 1978), sculptor, installation artist
 Walter Yarwood (1917–1996), abstract painter and a founding member of Painters Eleven
 Cecil Youngfox (1942–1987)

Z 

 Jarko Zavi (1907–1987), ceramist
 Joy Zemel Long (1922–2018), painter
 Robert Zend (1929–1985), typewriter, collage, multimedia, and digital artist; concrete poet
 Lorena Ziraldo (born 1960), painter
 Edward "Ted" Fenwick Zuber (born 1932), painter, photographer
 Tim Zuck (born 1941), painter

Groups 

 Les Automatistes
 Canadian Group of Painters
 Eastern Group of Painters
 General Idea
 Group of Seven
 Painters Eleven
 Professional Native Indian Artists Inc. (informally known as "Indian Group of Seven")
 Regina Five
 The Royal Art Lodge

See also 

Canadian Art
Canadian art
List of Canadian painters
List of Canadian women artists
List of Canadian women photographers
Feminist Art Movement
Precisionism
Scene painting
Regionalism
Abstract Expressionism
Pop Art
Happenings
Fluxus
Impressionism
Intermedia
Hard-edge painting
Minimalism
Post-Impressionism
Post-painterly Abstraction 
Color Field Painting
Post-Minimalism
Process Art
Site-specific art
Earth Art
Lyrical Abstraction
Photorealism
Conceptual Art
Postmodernism
Digital Art

Notes